Santo Domingo-Caudilla is a municipality located in the province of Toledo, Castile-La Mancha, Spain. According to the 2006 census (INE), the municipality has a population of 801 inhabitants.

Notable people
Federico Bahamontes (born 1928), professional road racing cyclist and Tour de France winner.

References

Municipalities in the Province of Toledo